Carolyn Allison Rodrigues-Birkett (born September 16, 1973) is a Guyanese politician who was appointed Permanent Representative of Guyana to the United Nations in 2020. She previously served as Director of the Food and Agriculture Organization Liaison Office in Geneva from 2017 to 2020 and Minister of Foreign Affairs of Guyana from 2008 to 2015.

Life and career
Rodrigues, an Amerindian, was born in Moruca, Santa Rosa, Barima-Waini Region. After attending a private school in Georgetown, she received a scholarship for Amerindians and went to study business administration at the University of Regina in Canada and returned to Guyana in 1993. She was required by her scholarship to work for Amerindian communities, and as a result she left the lumber company where she worked and instead went to work for the Inter-American Development Bank's Social Impact Amelioration Programme (SIMAP) in Guyana, although this meant 65% less pay. She became Coordinator of SIMAP's Amerindian Projects Programme, holding that post until 2001, when she went to study in social work at the University of Guyana.

Rodrigues was appointed to the Cabinet as Minister of Amerindian Affairs in April 2001. Following the 2006 general election, she was reappointed as Minister of Amerindian Affairs and sworn in on 4 September 2006. After nearly seven years as Minister of Amerindian Affairs, she was succeeded by Pauline Campbell-Sukhai on 4 January 2008.  She was then appointed as Minister of Foreign Affairs on 9 April 2008, replacing Rudy Insanally. She was sworn in on April 10.

Rodrigues continued to serve as Minister of Foreign Affairs until the People's Progressive Party (PPP) lost the May 2015 general election. She was subsequently offered a spot on the PPP's list of MPs, but she chose not to take a seat in the National Assembly, preferring to work abroad. She was appointed Director of the Food and Agriculture Organization Liaison Office with the United Nations in Geneva in August 2017, and Permanent Representative of Guyana to the United Nations in 2020.

References

1973 births
Living people
Female foreign ministers
Foreign ministers of Guyana
Government ministers of Guyana
Women government ministers of Guyana
People from Barima-Waini
University of Regina alumni
University of Guyana alumni
Guyanese people of indigenous peoples descent